George Mikes (15 February 1912 – 30 August 1987) was a Hungarian-born British journalist, humorist and writer, best known for his humorous commentaries on various countries.

Life 
George Mikes was born in 1912, in the small town of Siklós, in the southwest of Hungary. His father, Alfréd Mikes, was a successful lawyer, a profession he wanted his son to follow.

The experience of the German Jewish refugees coming to his home in Hungary for help after 1933 had left an abiding impression upon him. So in 1938, when Mikes had originally been sent to London to cover the Munich Crisis and expected to stay for only a couple of weeks, just one year before the outbreak of World War II he decided not to return to Hungary, and instead remained in England. He worked for the BBC's Hungarian Service from 1939 onwards, interrupted only by his internment as an enemy alien on the Isle of Man in 1940.

Living in exile in England, he broadcast to Hungary for the BBC during World War II, and also collaborated with the Hungarian emigration, and wrote political cabaret for the London Podium, a Hungarian theatre in London at that time, in collaboration with the Hungarian born composer Matyas Seiber. From 1939 he also made documentaries for the BBC Hungarian section, at first as a freelance correspondent and, from 1950, as an employee. He was naturalised as a British citizen in 1946. In 1956, he went back to Hungary to cover the Hungarian Revolution for BBC TV. From 1975 until his death on 30 August 1987 he also worked for the Hungarian section of Radio Free Europe.

He was president of the London branch of PEN, and a member of the Garrick Club.

His friends included the Hungarian writer Arthur Koestler, whose biography Mikes wrote (Arthur Koestler; the story of a friendship); J. B. Priestley; academic Doireann MacDermott; and André Deutsch, whose publishing house promoted Mikes as a writer.

He married twice and had a son called Martin by his first marriage, and a daughter called Judith by his second. He died in London on 30 August 1987. On 15 September 1991, a memorial plaque was unveiled at his childhood home.

Publications 
His first book, published in 1945, was We Were There To Escape – the true story of a Jugoslav officer about life in prisoner-of-war camps. The Times Literary Supplement praised the book for the humour it showed in parts, which led him to write his most famous satiric book, How to be an Alien, which proved a great success in post-war Britain in 1946. This book poked gentle fun at the English, including a one-line chapter on sex: "Continental people have sex lives; the English have hot-water bottles."  In his subsequent books Mikes blended local jokes into his own humour, dealt with (among others) Japan (The Land of the Rising Yen), Israel (Milk and Honey, The Prophet Motive), the US (How to Scrape Skies), the United Nations (How to Unite Nations), Australia (Boomerang), the British again (How to be Inimitable and How to be Decadent, both collected with How to be an Alien as How to be a Brit), and South America (How to Tango). Other subjects include God (How to be God), his cat (Tsi-Tsa), wealth (How to be Poor) and philosophy (How to be a Guru).

Apart from his commentaries, he wrote humorous fiction (Mortal Passion; The Spy Who Died of Boredom) and contributed to the satirical television series That Was The Week That Was.

He wrote his ironic autobiography with the title How to be Seventy, published in 1982.

Every now and then Mikes ventured into the territory of serious literature: his serious writing included a book about the Hungarian secret police and he narrated a BBC television report of the Hungarian Revolution of 1956.

According to Thomas Kabdebo, himself a Hungarian immigrant writer, Mikes' favourite comic device was to place himself as an inveterate yet vulnerable traveller; an ardent rationalist with European values, where he discovers national pretensions behind proud phraseology. Thus, he was able to flesh out national stereotypes with comic characteristics.

Mikes wrote over forty books, thirty-five of them humorous; however, in some way, it was a pity that his How to be an Alien was a long-lasting best seller. It pushed him into the category of critic who was viewed with benign fondness but not considered a serious thinker. In the preface to the 24th impression of his book How to be an Alien, he reflects on the book's success:
Since then I have actually written about a dozen books but I might as well have never written anything else. I remained the author of How to be an Alien even after I had published a collection of serious essays.

Selected bibliography

Non-fiction 

 The Epic of Lofoten (1941)
 Eight humorists (1954)
 We Were There to Escape: the true story of a Jugoslav officer (1945)
 The Hungarian Revolution (1957)
 A Study in Infamy: the operations of the Hungarian Secret Police (AVO) (1959)
 Arthur Koestler; the story of a friendship (1983)

References

Sources

 Penguin Readers Factsheet on How to be an Alien for teachers
 
 Hungarian Biographical Encyclopedia (in Hungarian)
  "George Mikes, 75; Wrote Gentle Satires And Serious Works", New York Times, 4 September 1987; retrieved 16 May 2017.
  Sorrel Kerbel: The Routledge Encyclopedia of Jewish Writers of the Twentieth Century, Taylor & Francis Books Inc., 2003. 

1912 births
1987 deaths
British autobiographers
20th-century Hungarian novelists
Hungarian Jews
20th-century British novelists
British humorists
Hungarian journalists
British Jewish writers
Hungarian emigrants to the United Kingdom
British people of Hungarian-Jewish descent
Naturalised citizens of the United Kingdom
British male novelists
Hungarian male novelists
20th-century Hungarian male writers
20th-century journalists